William Mervyn Carrick, known as Mervyn Carrick (born 13 February 1946) is a former Unionist politician from Northern Ireland representing the Democratic Unionist Party (DUP).

Early life and career
Born in Portadown, Carrick studied at Portadown Technical College before becoming an accountant. He joined the Democratic Unionist Party (DUP) and in 1990 was co-opted to Craigavon Borough Council.

Political career
Carrick was elected to the Northern Ireland Forum in 1996, representing Upper Bann, but unsuccessfully contested the Westminster seat of Upper Bann at the 1997 general election. He held his Stormont seat at the 1998 Northern Ireland Assembly election and also served as Mayor of Craigavon in 1998–99.

Following a dispute over reselection, he joined the other local DUP councillors in standing down for the 2001 election.

When he stood as an independent at the 2005 election he was unable to take a seat.

References

1946 births
Living people
People from Portadown
Democratic Unionist Party MLAs
Mayors of Craigavon
Members of Craigavon Borough Council
Members of the Northern Ireland Forum
Northern Ireland MLAs 1998–2003
Independent politicians in Northern Ireland